San Vito di Fagagna is a comune (municipality) in the Province of Udine in the Italian region Friuli-Venezia Giulia, located about  northwest of Trieste and about  west of Udine.

San Vito di Fagagna borders the following municipalities: Coseano, Fagagna, Mereto di Tomba, Rive d'Arcano.

References

Cities and towns in Friuli-Venezia Giulia